The Ojai Valley News is a locally owned and operated weekly newspaper in Ojai, California, that has been in continuous publication since 1891. First known as The Ojai, the Ojai Valley News serves a population of 30,000 people in the city of Ojai and surrounding areas.

External links
 Ojai Valley News website

Mass media in Ventura County, California
Weekly newspapers published in California
Ojai, California
Companies based in Ventura County, California
1891 establishments in California
Publications established in 1891